David Elm may refer to:

 David Elm or Ulmus davidiana, a tree
 David Elm (footballer) (born 1983), Swedish footballer